Mohamed Omar Hagi Mohamoud (Somali: Maxamed Cumar Xaaji Maxamuud, Arabic: محمد عمر حاج محمود ) (born January 1981), also known as Mohamed Hagi is a Somali diplomat, politician and academic currently serving as the Chief Representative of the Republic of Somaliland Representative Office in Taiwan.

Mohamed combines considerable distinctive feats of being a professional person with extensive experience in the various fields of diplomacy, academia, policy making programmes and strategic systems of governance. Mohamed also gives academic lectures and presentations to postgraduate students in politics, diplomacy and international affairs mainly about Africa, the Middle East and recently in the Asia Pacific region.

Prior foreign diplomatic posting, Mohamed has been a Senior Political Adviser at the Ministry of Foreign Affairs and International Cooperation of the Republic of Somaliland. He also formerly served the Ministry of Finance Development as a Senior Policy Adviser on strategic planning and the macroeconomic policy reform. During the first year of President Silanyo, Mohamed served as Maritime Security Consultant to Somaliland Coast Guard - the position was not political but technical. Prior public career, Mohamed also worked with the Local and international Non-Governmental Organisations in Somaliland and abroad as an Executive Director, Programme Manager and a Senior Policy Adviser.

Formal education and early life
Mohamed was born and raised in Hargeisa. He began his early Mal'amad Qur'an and primary schooling in 1986 in Hargeisa, which later disrupted by the Somali Civil War in 1988. Mohamed continued his primary and intermediate formal education from Sheikh Madar and Biyo Dha'ay schools soon after Somaliland restored its sovereignty from the union with Somalia in 1991. He later became the first Somaliland students enrolled Farah Omar secondary School in 1996 after the war. Mohamed also studied higher education diplomas of Business Administration and Project Management from local colleges in Hargeisa, Somaliland. He then officially joined the Non-Governmental Humanitarian and Development Organisations operating in Somaliland and Somalia.

During humanitarian fieldwork operations with the International and Local NGOs, Mohamed travelled different urban and rural places in East Africa, particularly Somaliland, Somalia, Ethiopia, Djibouti and Kenya. This operation buttressed his experience in Somali socioeconomics, social structure, and political culture as well as societal change. He later moved to the UK for his higher education where he studied Political Science, Security Studies, International Development and Philosophy.

Mohamed is a (PhD) researcher in Politics and Philosophy at Manchester Metropolitan University. He obtained a BA Honours in Political Science, a Postgraduate Degree in Security Studies and a Masters Degree in Politics and International Studies at the University of Warwick, United Kingdom.

Higher education 
 B.A., University of Warwick.
 M.A., University of Warwick.
 PhD, Manchester Metropolitan University.

Academic career 
Mohamed is a political analyst, and contributes to both Somali and English-speaking media and newspapers. He also published articles on globalization, policy papers on Africa and global trading system, ethnic conflicts in Africa as well as elements of good governance and foreign aid. Other areas of published opinion articles include the homegrown Somaliland peace-building and democracy as well as theories of foreign aid dependency in the Least Developed Countries. Mohamed is currently working on his first book; Turkey's Strategic Advantage in Sub-Saharan Africa.

References

External links 
 
 

1981 births
People from Hargeisa
Living people
Somaliland diplomats
Government of Somaliland
Political office-holders in Somaliland
Peace, Unity, and Development Party politicians
People from Maroodi Jeex